Royal Air Force Station Wombleton or RAF Wombleton is a former Royal Air Force station located  east of Helmsley, North Yorkshire and  north east of Easingwold, North Yorkshire, England.

Station history
Wombleton opened in 1943 as a sub-station of RAF Topcliffe. It was part of RAF Bomber Command's No. 6 Group RCAF, and along with the main station at Topcliffe and the station at Dishforth, was designated part of No 61 (Training) Base. In November 1944, No 61 Base was transferred to No 7 (Training) Group and it was renumbered No 76 Training Base. No 1666 Heavy Conversion Unit (HCU) was the first unit to move to Wombleton. Aircrew who were originally trained on twin-engined aircraft such as Wellingtons or Whitleys received conversion training on heavy four-engined bombers such as the Halifax or Lancaster. No 1666 HCU remained at Wombleton until the end of the war. The RAF took over the station and stayed for several years with the RAF Regiment using the site as a battle school.

Units and aircraft

Current use
Wombleton airport is now used for recreational flying.

See also
List of former Royal Air Force stations

References

Citations

Bibliography

 Delve, Ken. The Source Book of the RAF. Shrewsbury, Shropshire, UK: Airlife Publishing, 1994. .

External links
 Airfields in Yorkshire - Wombleton
 Control towers - RAF Wombleton airfield
 Wombleton RCAF Memorial
 Former RAF Wombleton on Wikimapia
 Wombleton on Air of Authority - A History of RAF Organisation
 Image of RAF Wombleton in 1946

Wombleton
Buildings and structures in North Yorkshire
Womble
Military history of North Yorkshire